Bryan Collegiate High School is a public high school in Bryan, Texas (United States). It is one of four high schools in the Bryan Independent School District. In 2017, the school was rated "Met Standard" by the Texas Education Agency.

Bryan Collegiate High School is an Early College High School: its students take dual credit classes all four years of high school through a partnership with Blinn College.

Bryan Collegiate High School does not have varsity team sports, but it does offer club-level sports (not affiliated with the University Interscholastic League) and physical education.

References

External links
Official Website

High schools in Brazos County, Texas
Public high schools in Texas
Bryan, Texas